St. Andrew's College is an Anglican high school for boys located in Makhanda (Grahamstown), Eastern Cape province of South Africa. It was founded in 1855 by the Right Reverend John Armstrong, the first Bishop of Grahamstown. It is a semi boarding school, with a number of day boys. St. Andrew's College caters to 480 pupils from around the globe.  The school is also a member of the G30 Schools group and closely associated with its brother school, St. Andrew's Preparatory School, and its sister school the Diocesan School for Girls.

History 
In a letter dated August, 1855, Bishop Armstrong writes: 

The laying of the foundation stone took place on 15 August 1855. Prior to this there existed a grammar school, founded by Bishop Robert Gray in 1849 on the site currently occupied by the Good Shepherd School, under the management of Mr. M.C. Bendelack, who was soon succeeded by the Rev. F. Bankes.  Bankes was appointed principal of the new college, retaining also the title of Head-Master of St. Andrew's College Grammar School, as his school and all funds belonging to it were merged into the new institution. The Society for Promoting Christian Knowledge gave £1000 towards the building to which they added £500 in 1857, and a like sum in 1860. A supplementary sum was subscribed by friends of the Bishop.

St Andrew's College was incorporated by an Act of the Cape Parliament in September 1887, this Act was amended in 1932 and 1985. It has since been controlled by a council composed of communicant members of the Anglican Church, administering the school in terms of a trust deed, leaving its internal economy and discipline in the hands of the principal, who in terms of the 1887 Act was required to be a cleric. The Bishop of Grahamstown is ex officio Visitor to the college.

Campus 

The school campus straddles the main road from Cradock, Eastern Cape into Grahamstown and is an open campus with buildings, sports fields and other facilities spread over a number of city blocks.

Chapel 
The chapel, dedicated to St. Andrew and designed by Sir Herbert Baker, is at the heart of the school.

The foundation stone of the new chapel was laid by the Rt Revd Charles Cornish, bishop of Grahamstown on St. Andrew's Day, 1905, the jubilee year of the college. But chiefly owing to lack of funds the stone remained built into a buttress at the back of Espin Cottage, and no start was made until 1913 when the building was begun on plans by Messrs. Herbert Baker & Kendall of Cape Town. A corner stone, to commemorate the building, was laid by the Hon. Sir Lewis Mitchell, C.V.O. on 8 September that year.

The design for the new chapel is in the early Gothic manner, but in order to suit the comparatively sunny climate of the Eastern Cape, there is just that suggestion of Italian treatment which prevents it from being a direct copy of an English type. The form is that of a central nave of six bays, spanned by an open timber roof with massive beams, king posts and struts, the prototypes of which form such an attractive feature in: so many old English churches. There are two narrow side aisles to serve as passages, each having space for one row of additional seats in case of emergency. The chancel has an apsidal east end, and is to be covered by a groined roof constructed in concrete, the sanctuary windows being kept high in such a way as to cut into the semi-circular line of the vault in an effective manner. Instead of transepts, the plan provides a projecting vestry on the north side so as to preserve the cruciform plan, while the side aisles at the west are terminated against small projecting porches.

At the west end the-baptistry is placed projecting westward of the wall and forming a semi-circular recess, which is to be covered with a grained ceiling. Springing from the projecting baptistry are buttresses which are carried up with diminishing outline and form a picturesque bell cote to terminate the west end of the roof. As far as possible local material was used. The walls throughout were built in Grahamstown stone with a rough face, both inside and out. This stone demands a simple treatment for the dressings-so that most of the windows are plain-but those around the apse include some effective tracery.

The roof is covered with tiles made in the province on the Broseley pattern, and laid to a steep pitch. The aisles are paved with red tiles, while the floor of the chancel is paved in somewhat the same manner, and the floor under the seats is, of course be boarded in the ordinary way.

The nave is about  ×  irrespective of the side aisles; the chancel and sanctuary  × ; from the floor of nave to ridge of roof about  The total accommodation is for 330, of which number about 30 may be seated in the choir. Contrary to the custom of college chapels, the seats  are all arranged facing the east instead of being placed down the two sides, facing one another.

The contractors were Messrs. Carr & Co., Paarl.

Boarding houses 
Six houses comprise the school:

 Upper
 Merriman named after the Rt Rev'd Nathaniel Merriman, previously known as Lower House
 Graham
 Armstrong named after the Rt Rev'd John Armstrong this house was built in 1898
 Espin named after Canon John Espin, built 1902. 
 Mullins, named after Canon R.J. Mullins [aka the Republic Of Mullins]

Curriculum 
The school follows the curriculum set by the Independent Examinations Board (IEB), which is the curriculum  followed by most private schools in South Africa. In 2019 the school also implemented the Cambridge Assessment International Education A Level curriculum as an alternative syllabus to the IEB.

Extracurricular activities 
The school has an active pipe band.  The band is an important part of the traditional life of the school, the pipe band leads the cadet corps during parades.  St Andrew's College is one of the few schools in South Africa that still trains a cadet corps.  The cadet corps is attached to the First City Regiment

The school has three cultural societies whose membership is by invitation:

 Alchemists meet twice a term to discuss matters of general, non-scientific interest.
 Astronomers meet 6 times a year where boys present papers of a scientific nature to the club which is discussed over supper.
 Cornish for a selected group of boys who share a love of poetry.

Rugby union is the most played sport at the school. The school has produced at least two Springbok rugby players, Ryan Kankowski and Nick Mallett. Rowing is a popular and well supported competitive sport, and the school has produced at least one Olympic rower, James Thompson.

Sport 

The sports that are offered in the school are:

 Athletics
 Basketball
 Cricket
 Cross country
 Cycling
 Equestrian
 Golf
 Hockey
 Mountain biking
 Rowing
 Rugby
 Soccer
 Squash
 Swimming
 Tennis
 Water polo

School hymn 
The school hymn is "Jesus Calls Us, O'er the Tumult", the office hymn for the feast of St. Andrew.

Notable Old Andreans

Businessmen 
 Sir Michael Edwardes, business executive
 Graham Mackay, chairman and CEO of SABMiller
 Mark Patterson, co-founder of MatlinPatterson Global Advisers
 Jacko Maree, former CEO of Standard Bank
 Antony Ball, founder Brait Capital Partners
 Myles Ruck, former CEO of Liberty Life
 Andy Leith, former managing director of Investec South Africa and International Head of Investment Banking, currently serves as CEO of Bud Group (Pty)
 Pete Hird, former Director of Dimension Data Holdings Limited 
 Peter Oliver, owner of Oliver Bonacini Restaurants

Engineers, scientists, lawyers and medical men 
 Athelstan Cornish-Bowden, land surveyor
 Sir Basil Schonland, South Africa's Scientist of the 20th Century, Order of Mapungubwe - Gold class (OMG), important in the development of radar.
 Charles Cummings (lawyer), Chief Justice of the Sudan in 1946
 Claude Bettington, mechanical engineer, soldier and aviator
 Ernest Edward Galpin, botanist
 Francis Wilson (economist)
 Guybon Atherstone, railway engineer
 James Henry Greathead, engineer renowned for his work on the London Underground railway.
 Kim Bailie, aerospace engineer
 Lennox Broster, surgeon
 Sir Montagu Cotterill, surgeon and cricketer, the  son of the bishop of Grahamstown, the Rt Revd Henry Cotterill and brother to George Edward Cotterill, headmaster of college.
 Newton Ogilvie Thompson, Chief Justice of South Africa 1971–1974
 Reginald Frederick Lawrence, biologist
 Sir Stanley Rees, High Court judge in England
 Thomas Graham (lawyer)
 William Bleloch, metallurgist
 Prof. Bruce Rubidge - Past Director of ESI, currently Director of the DST-NRF Centre of Excellence for Palaeosciences. Karoo Palaeontologist.

Sportsmen 
 Adrian Birrell, former First-Class cricketer and South African national cricket team assistant coach. 
 Andrew Birch, cricketer for the Warriors
 Anton Murray, former South African Test cricketer
 Antony Roy Clark, cricketer
 Bevil Rudd, Olympic Gold Medallist - 400m (Antwerp, 1920)
 Bill Lundie, former South African Test cricketer
 Bill Taberer, rugby player
 Brian Skosana, rugby player
 Cecil Dixon, former South African Test cricketer
 Chase Minnaar, rugby player
 Claude Floquet, former South African Test cricketer
 Clem Currie, former Springbok rugby player
Chris Benjamin (cricketer)
 Cuth Mullins, rugby player
 Daantjie van de Vyver, former Springbok rugby player
 Dane van der Westhuyzen, rugby player
 David Murray, rugby player
 Fanie Cronje, former Springbok rugby player
 Frank Douglass, former Springbok rugby player
 Harry Birrell (cricketer)
 Heinrich Smit, rugby player who represented Namibia at the 2015 World Cup
 Henry Taberer, former South African Test cricketer
 Jack Dold, former Springbok rugby player
 Jackie Powell, former Springbok rugby player
 Jake Green (rower)
 James Price (cricketer)
 James Thompson, Olympic Gold Medallist - Men's lightweight coxless four, London 2012 Summer Olympics
 John Rowley, cricketer
 Lewis Gordon Pugh, pioneering swimmer and environmentalist
 Martin Hanley, former South African Test cricketer
 Michael Price, cricketer for the Warriors
 Nick Mallett, former Springbok rugby player and coach
 Pat Fairfield, motor racing driver, winner of the 1937 Rand Grand Prix, died after an accident in the 1937 24 Hours of Le Mans
 Peter van der Merwe, South African cricket captain, 1965—67
 Pompey Norton, former South African Test cricketer
 Roger Barrow, coach of the South African national rowing team.
 Ronald Wylde, athlete
 Ross Geldenhuys, rugby player
 Russell Bennett, former Springbok rugby player
 Ryan Kankowski, Springbok rugby player
 Sintu Manjezi, rugby player
 Thomas Gubb (1926), rugby union international, represented Great Britain on 1927 British Lions tour to Argentina
 Tom Hobson, former Springbok rugby player
 Tyler Paul, rugby player
 Worthington Hoskin, cricketer (and rugby player)

Clergy
Peter Hinchliff, priest and academic
Robin Briggs, Suffragan Bishop of Pretoria
Wilfrid Parker, Bishop of Pretoria

Musicians, actors, authors and artists 
 Stephen Gray (writer)
 Bongani Ndodana-Breen, musician and composer
 Ian Roberts, actor, playwright and singer
 Ernest Glanville, author
 Peter Cartwright (actor)
 Jonty Driver, poet and writer
 Ivan Mitford-Barberton, sculptor and writer
Vere Stent, war correspondent and editor of the Pretoria News

Nobility and politicians 
 Edward Coke, Earl of Leicester CBE, Holkham Estate, Norfolk. Past chairman of the Historic Houses Association
 Kingsley Fairbridge
 Thomas Graham
 Robert Coryndon, British colonial administrator
 Randolph Vigne, member of the Liberal Party of South Africa
 Howard Unwin Moffat, prime minister of Southern Rhodesia

Soldiers, sailors and airmen 
 Air Marshal the Reverend Sir Henry Paterson Fraser 
 Duane Hudson, British intelligence officer
 Brigadier Sir Miles Hunt-Davis, KCVO, CBE, Private Secretary to the Duke of Edinburgh
 Colonel Sir Ernest Lucas Guest KBE, CMG, CVO, LLD
 Air Vice Marshal John Howe CB, CBE, AFC, RAF
 Major-General William Henry Evered Poole CB, CBE, DSO
 Rear Admiral M.R. Terry-Lloyd SSA SM
 Rear Admiral Kenneth Snow, RN
 Surgeon Rear Admiral Ronald Edward Snow, QHP, CB, LVO, RN
Lieutenant General Sir Maurice Grove-White

Victoria Cross holders 
Two Old Andreans have been awarded the Victoria Cross:
 Major Charles Herbert Mullins, VC in the Boer War and 
 Lieutenant-Colonel John Sherwood-Kelly, VC in the First World War

Notable staff 
 Charles Fortune, broadcaster and writer, especially noted for his cricket commentaries on radio.
 Danie Craven, international rugby administrator.
 Harry Lee (cricketer)
 George Cory, chemist and historian
 Arthur Matthews (mathematician), first lecturer in mathematics and physical science, and later professor of mathematics at Rhodes University
 Roger Wilson (bishop)

Headmasters 

 The Revd F. Bankes (1855–1859)
 The Revd F.Y. St. Leger (1859–1862)
 The Revd George Edward Cotterill (1863–1865), the son of the Rt Revd Henry Cotterill, bishop of Grahamstown
 The Revd Langford S. Browne (1865–1875)
 The Revd G. Gould Ross (1875–1881)
 The Revd Canon John Espin (1882–1902)
 The Revd W. S. Macgowan (1902–1908)
 The Revd Canon Percy W.H. Kettlewell (1909–1933)
 The Revd Canon C.B. Armstrong (1934–1938)
 Ronald F. Currey (Oxon) (1939–1955)
 Freddie Spencer Chapman (1956–1962)
 J.L. Cawse (1962–1964)
 The Revd Canon John Aubrey (1965–1971)
 Eric B. Norton (1972–1980)
 Arthur F.G. Cotton (1981–1993)
 Antony R. Clark (Cantab) (1994–2002)
 David B. Wylde (Oxon) (2003–2008)
 Paul A. Edey (2009–2014)
 Alan Thompson (2015 - January 2022)
 Aidan Smith, Interim Headmaster (2022)
 Tom Hamilton (January 2023 - present)

Gallery

See also 

Rhodes Scholarship
List of boarding schools

References

Further reading

External links 

 
 Old Andrean site

1855 establishments in the Cape Colony
Anglican schools in South Africa
Boarding schools in South Africa
Boys' schools in South Africa
Buildings and structures in Makhanda, Eastern Cape
Educational institutions established in 1855
Herbert Baker buildings and structures
Private schools in the Eastern Cape